Frederick Ralph Cornelius Penner  (born November 6, 1946) is a Canadian children's entertainer and musician known for the song "The Cat Came Back" and his television series, Fred Penner's Place, which aired on CBC in Canada from 1985 to 1997 and in the United States on Nickelodeon from 1989 to 1992.

Life and career

Early life
Penner was born on November 6, 1946, in Winnipeg, Manitoba, to Lydia Agathe Penner (née Winters, 1913–2005) and Edward W. Penner of Winkler, Manitoba. By the age of four, he had begun making up songs while travelling on the bus with his mother. He taught himself how to play the guitar when he was in grade school, and performed in school choirs and pageants. Through his experiences with his sister Susan, who has Down syndrome, he recognized the therapeutic value of music.

Penner received his high school diploma at Kelvin High School, where he took lead roles in the Gilbert and Sullivan operettas. After graduating from the University of Winnipeg with a Bachelor of Arts degree in economics and psychology, he spent time working with mentally and physically disabled children, using music to comfort and entertain.

Music and television career
By 1972, Penner was a full-time professional musician, performing folk music songs in Winnipeg. In the mid-70s, Penner performed in a number of groups, most notably the folk music group Kornstock, along with Al Simmons, Bob King, both of whom also became well-known children's entertainers, and drummer Mike Klym.

In 1977, Penner met choreographer and future wife, Odette Graziella Heyn, with whom he started a children's dance theatre company. Penner accepted an offer to do a recording, which resulted in the album The Cat Came Back, which launched his career and established him as one of Canada's leading children's entertainers. Penner is noted as a pioneer of children's music in Canada.

In 1984, he appeared on the children's television show, The Elephant Show, singing "The Cat Came Back" and was given his own show, Fred Penner's Place the next year. The show became a hit and aired on CBC in Canada from 1985 to 1997 and in the United States on Nickelodeon from 1989 to 1992. The show is known for Penner's musical performances, special guests, puppets including Word Bird, and the famous title sequence, which features Penner's entry through a hollow log. The show won or received nominations for several awards including a Juno Award in 1989 and a Gemini Award in 1994. Penner recorded more than 900 episodes of the show. Since the show ended, Penner continues to perform and record regularly.

Accolades
Penner has received a Juno Award for Children's Album of the Year four times: in 1989, 2003, 2015 and 2018.

In 1991, he was made a Member of the Order of Canada for "using music and song to entertain and educate his young audience". In 2011, he was made a Member of the Order of Manitoba.

Personal
Currently, Penner splits his time between Winnipeg and Toronto. He has four children by his first marriage to Odette Heyn. He remarried in 2016, to theatre director Rae Ellen Bodie. His daughter Hayley Gene Penner is a songwriter.

Penner has promoted a number of humanitarian causes with UNESCO, UNICEF, World Vision and the National Conference on Down Syndrome.

Filmography

Film

Television

Discography

 The Cat Came Back (1979)
 The Polka Dot Pony (1981) (reissued as Poco)
 Special Delivery (1983) (reissued as Ebeneezer Sneezer)
 A House for Me (1985)
 Fred Penner's Place (1988)
 Collections (1989)
 The Season (1990)
 Happy Feet (1992)
 What A Day! (1994)
 Moonlight Express (1996)
 Sing With Fred (2003)
 Where In The World (2014)
 Hear the Music (2017)

Sources

References

External links
 
 Biography, on Paquin Entertainment's representation site
 

1946 births
20th-century Canadian guitarists
20th-century Canadian male singers
21st-century Canadian guitarists
21st-century Canadian male singers
Canadian children's musicians
Canadian children's television personalities
Canadian children's television presenters
Canadian folk guitarists
Canadian Folk Music Award winners
Canadian folk singers
Canadian male guitarists
Canadian Mennonites
Mennonite musicians
Juno Award for Children's Album of the Year winners
Living people
Members of the Order of Canada
Members of the Order of Manitoba
Musicians from Winnipeg
University of Winnipeg alumni